Adam Cockburn is an Australian former child actor and DJ who appeared in feature films made in the 1980s and in TV series aired in the early 1990s. In July 1986 he took the role of the boy apprentice (John) in the Australian Opera production of Benjamin Britten's Peter Grimes for eight performances at the Sydney Opera House. In August of the following year he was Tsarevitch Alexis in the musical theatre version of Rasputin the Musical Revolution at the State Theatre. Cockburn later worked as a disc jockey.

Filmography

References

External links

Living people
Australian male child actors
Australian male film actors
Australian DJs
Adam
Year of birth missing (living people)